Hyperolius benguellensis (common name: Benguella long reed frog, Benguella reed frog, Bocage's sharp-nosed reed frog) is a species of frog in the family Hyperoliidae. It is found in southern Angola and northern Botswana and Namibia, but other sources cite a wider and more eastern distribution. It is similar to Hyperolius nasutus and have been considered a synonym of that species. Hyperolius benguellensis is not considered threatened.

Description
Their body is long and slender. Tadpoles are unknown.

Habitat and behaviour
Hyperolius benguellensis is a common frog associated with moist habitats with emergent vegetation (margins of swamps, rivers and lakes) in savanna and grassland habitats. Male frogs call from elevated positions in vegetation. The call is a brief note consisting of five pulses, followed by 14 pulses at a
slower rate.

References

benguellensis
Frogs of Africa
Amphibians of Angola
Amphibians of Botswana
Amphibians of Namibia
Amphibians described in 1893
Taxa named by José Vicente Barbosa du Bocage
Taxonomy articles created by Polbot